The Forbidden Kingdom is the soundtrack to the film of the same name directed by Rob Minkoff. It was released on July 22, 2008 and July 29, 2008 on iTunes.

Track listing

References

2008 soundtrack albums